Pseudiragoides is a genus of moths of the family Limacodidae.

Species
Pseudiragoides florianii Solovyev & Witt, 2011
Pseudiragoides itsova Solovyev & Witt, 2011
Pseudiragoides spadix Solovyev & Witt, 2009

References 

Limacodidae genera
Limacodidae